The list of Boeing 727 operators lists both former and current operators of the aircraft.

Original commercial operators
List of operators who purchased or leased aircraft new:

Other commercial operators
List of operators who purchased or leased aircraft second-hand:

Government, military and other operators
As well as commercial operators the 727 has been used by military, government and private operators.  The United States military used the 727 as a military transport, designated as the C-22.

Afghan Air Force

Angolan Air Force

Belgian Air Force

Military of Benin

Burkina Faso Air Force

Military of Cameroon

Colombian Air Force
Government of Colombia

Air Force of the Democratic Republic of the Congo

Ecuadorian Air Force

Gambian National Guard

Imperial Iranian Air Force

Malian Air Force

Mexican Air Force
Federal Preventive Police

No. 40 Squadron RNZAF
Royal New Zealand Air Force 

Nigerian Air Force

Panamanian Air Force

Qatar Amiri Flight

Government of Tatarstan

Saudia Royal Flight

Military of Tajikistan

T2 Aviation

SFR Yugoslav Air Force

References
Notes

Sources

727
Operators